The Benin national handball team is the national handball team of Benin.

African Championship record
1996 – 9th place

External links
IHF profile

Men's national handball teams
National sports teams of Benin